The Holy Family is a 2006 Italian television film directed by Raffaele Mertes and starring  Alessandro Gassmann and Ana Caterina Morariu.

Plot

Cast 

 Alessandro Gassmann as Joseph
 Ana Caterina Morariu as Mary
 Brando Pacitto as Jesus
 Franco Nero as Zachary
 Ángela Molina as Elisabeth  
 Massimiliano Varrese as James
 Lorenzo De Angelis as Jude
 Dino Abbrescia as Clopas
 Jackie Sawiris as Mary of Clopas
  Gian Luca Belardi as Dimacus  
  Giacomo Gonnella as Titus

References

External links

2006 television films
2006 films
Italian drama films
Italian television films
Films set in Italy
Portrayals of Jesus on television
Films about Jesus
Portrayals of the Virgin Mary in film
Television films based on the Bible
Portrayals of Saint Joseph in film
2006 drama films
2000s Italian films